Issues and Answers was a once-weekly TV news program that was telecast by the American Broadcasting Company network from November 1960 to November 1981. The series was distributed to the ABC affiliate stations on Sunday afternoons for either live broadcast or video taped for later broadcast.

Issues and Answers was ABC's response to such TV programs as NBC's Meet the Press and CBS's Face the Nation. It featured TV reporters interviewing selected newsmakers of the contemporary time period – mostly government officials, both domestic and foreign. Unlike the other networks' news-interview TV programs, which featured newspaper and radio reporters along with TV correspondents, Issues and Answers more commonly featured only ABC News correspondents.

The program's theme song for many years was the third movement (the "Song of the Blacksmith") of the Second Suite in F for Military Band (Op. 28, No. 2) by Gustav Holst.

For its entire run it was produced by Margaret "Peggy" Whedon, one of ABC's first female correspondents.

Issues and Answers was canceled in 1981, succeeded by the 60-minute This Week with David Brinkley.

References

External links
Issues and Answers at IMDB

ABC News
1960 American television series debuts
1981 American television series endings
American Broadcasting Company original programming
1970s American television series
1980s American television news shows
American Sunday morning talk shows